This is a list of secondary highways in Algoma District, most of which serve as logging roads or provide access to isolated and sparsely populated areas in the Algoma District of northeastern Ontario.  Some of the shorter ones are also access routes for communities with moderate amounts of tourism, most famously St. Joseph Island's highway 548.

Highway 519 

Secondary Highway 519, commonly referred to as Highway 519, is a provincially maintained highway in the Canadian province of Ontario. A private logging road continues east from there.

Highway 519 was assumed in 1956, and has remained unchanged since then. The route is gravel surface throughout its length and encounters no communities of any size along its length, aside from Dubreuilville.

Highway 532 

Secondary Highway 532, commonly referred to as Highway 532, is a provincially maintained secondary highway in the Canadian province of Ontario. The route connects several mining and milling towns in Unorganized Algoma District, notably Searchmont.

A former designation of Highway 532 travelled through Muskoka along the Parry Sound Colonization Road and was redesignated as Highway 141 in 1974. At that time, the present route was established following what was until then a segment of Highway 556. It has remained unchanged since then.

Highway 538 

Secondary Highway 538, commonly referred to as Highway 538, is a provincially maintained highway in the Canadian province of Ontario. The route was designated in 1956 and has remained unchanged since.

Highway 546 

Secondary Highway 546, commonly referred to as Highway 546, is a secondary highway in the Canadian province of Ontario.

Between the intersections with Highway 17 and Highway 639, the highway is part of the Deer Trail tourist route. From north of the intersection with Highway 554, it follows the Little White River.

Highway 547 

Secondary Highway 547, commonly referred to as Highway 547, is a secondary highway in the Canadian province of Ontario.

Highway 548 

Secondary Highway 548, commonly referred to as Highway 548, is a secondary highway in the Canadian province of Ontario. Despite the route's secondary highway designation, it is the main and most important highway of St. Joseph Island. This highway consists of the Bernt Gilbertson Bridge to the island and a continuous loop route that circles the island.

The highway connects the hamlets of Richard's Landing and Hilton Beach, and guides tourists to Fort St. Joseph. Between the bridge road and Richard's Landing, as well as along the bridge route, it is built up to King's Highway standards. The remainder of the route is built to secondary highway standards, with a single solid centerline throughout.

Termini

North-South segment 
Northern terminus: Highway 17/Trans Canada Highway.

Loop segment 
To aid in navigation and addressing, segments of the loop have been given suffix letters by the local municipalities, which usually correspond to the local road name. For example, the portion of Highway 548 which is signed along D Line is named 548D, along Huron Line is it named 548H, etc.

Highway 550 

Secondary Highway 550, commonly referred to as Highway 550, is a secondary highway in the Canadian province of Ontario. It runs east/west from the city of Sault Ste. Marie, Ontario to the hamlet of Gros Cap in Prince Township. It is known as Second Line within the Sault's city limits.

Its eastern terminus is an intersection with Highway 17, the Trans-Canada Highway, at the north end of the city. From here it is a four-lane undivided road, used heavily by commercial truck traffic as a link between Highway 17 and Carmen's Way, the truck bypass linking Second Line with the International Bridge, where Carmen's Way turns into Interstate 75. Trucks are now able to avoid the downtown core by using Highway 17, Highway 550, and Carmen's Way to reach the border with the U.S. Highway 550 reduces to two lanes west of Goulais Avenue. The highway intersects with Highway 565, also known as Airport Road. Highway 550 continues to its western terminus, at a roundabout on the shores of Lake Superior, in Gros Cap.

The MTO maintains the  portion of Highway550 west of Town Line Road. A  section of Second Line between Carmen's Way and Highway17 (Great Northern Road) is maintained under a Connecting Link agreement. The remainder, between Town Line Road and Carmen's Way, is maintained by the city of Sault Ste. Marie.

Highway 552 

Secondary Highway 552, commonly referred to as Highway 552, is a secondary highway in the Canadian province of Ontario, located within the Algoma District.

It passes through the communities of Kirby's Corner and Bourdage Corner, and intersects with Highway 17, the main route of the Trans-Canada Highway, just outside Karalash Corners.

Highway 554 

Secondary Highway 554, commonly referred to as Highway 554, is a short secondary highway in the Canadian province of Ontario. The highway follows the valley of the Little White River for most of its length.

Highway 555
Secondary Highway 555, commonly referred to as Highway 555, is the former designation for a secondary highway in Blind River, which extended from Highway 17 to Granary Lake. The highway also had the street names Woodward Avenue in the main population centre of Blind River, and Granary Lake Road north of Highway 557.

When the route number was removed from the system in the 1990s, the portion of the route south of the Highway 557 intersection was renumbered as an extension of Highway 557. The Granary Lake Road section was entirely decommissioned from the provincial highway system, and now exists only as a local road.

In 1991, the Ministry of Transportation issued a report which proposed that the route be extended to meet Spine Road in Elliot Lake, creating an alternate route which would reduce the length of a commute between Elliot Lake and Blind River by approximately 20 kilometres compared to the current routes of Highway 17 and Highway 108. While the ministry has not announced a plan to proceed with the construction, in 2015 Elliot Lake's city council passed a motion calling for the project to be revived.

Highway 556 

Secondary Highway 556, commonly referred to as Highway 556 or Ranger Lake Road is a secondary highway in the province of Ontario, Canada. Its western terminus is at Highway 17 in the hamlet of Heyden, just north of Sault Ste. Marie. Its eastern terminus is at Highway 129.

This paved section runs from its western terminus to the intersection with Highway 532 near Searchmont and is therefore informally known as the Searchmont Highway. From this point, the highway surface is rough gravel for its remaining length. Ranger Lake is the only community on this portion of Highway 556. Despite its relatively poor surface, it is considered an alternate link between Chapleau and Sault Ste. Marie.

Highway 557 

Secondary Highway 557, commonly referred to as Highway 557, is a secondary highway in the Canadian province of Ontario, located within the Algoma District. The road has the street name Woodward Avenue from Highway 17 to Granary Lake Road, and Matinenda Road west of that intersection.

Prior to the late 1990s, the Woodward Avenue segment of the highway was designated as Highway 555. The 557 designation applied only to Matinenda Road, while the 555 designation continued along Granary Lake Road. When Granary Lake Road was decommissioned from the provincial highway system, the 557 designation was extended along Woodward Avenue rather than the 555 designation being shifted from Granary to Matinenda.

The MTO does not maintain the  section of Highway557 south of the Granary Lake Road intersection through Blind River, This section is signed as part of the highway for continuity to Highway17.

Highway 563 

Marie, and following the shoreline of Batchawana Bay. The area is a vacation spot, and Highway 563 goes through the community of the same name as the bay. Batchawana Bay has a church, post office, elementary school, motel, and homes for the permanent residents, among them First Nations people. Near the Hwy 563/17 junction is the Carp River, and there are rental cabins along the riverbank.

Highway 565 

Secondary Highway 565, commonly referred to as Highway 565, is a secondary highway in the Canadian province of Ontario, near Sault Ste. Marie. Originally, Highway 565's southern terminus was the intersection of Point-Aux-Pins Road, near the St. Mary's River. It was initially truncated at the entrance to Sault Ste. Marie Airport but now ends at Base Line, at the Sault Ste. Marie-Prince Township boundary.

Highway 631 

Secondary Highway 631, commonly referred to as Highway 631, is a secondary highway in the Algoma District of Northern Ontario.

Highway 631 is a very isolated road.

The road was opened on May 26, 1973, costing C$7.5 million to construct. The White River terminus became a subject of brief controversy after it was rerouted to meet Highway 17 within property owned by the town's mayor, Naldo Bracci.

Highway 638 

Secondary Highway 638, commonly referred to as Highway 638, is a secondary highway located in the District of Algoma in Ontario. The highway measures  in length, extending from Echo Bay eastward through the communities of Sylvan Valley, Leeburn and Ophir, where it turns southward and runs south through Rydal Bank, Bruce Station, and finally to its southeastern terminus, also at Highway 17, in the town of Bruce Mines.

Highway 639 

Secondary Highway 639, commonly referred to as Highway 639, is a secondary highway in the Canadian province of Ontario.

The highway does not link the city to any significant residential settlements, but is used primarily as an access road to Mississagi Provincial Park and a few recreational lodges. The highway had an average daily traffic count of just 70 vehicles in 2007.

The highway is a continuation of the same roadway as Highway 108, the main highway into Elliot Lake from the south. It is part of the Deer Trail tourist route.

Highway 651 

Secondary Highway 651, commonly referred to as Highway 651, is a provincially maintained highway in the Canadian province of Ontario.

Highway 651 was established on Centennial anniversary of Confederation, but did not connect to any other roads originally; access to the route was provided from Missanabie. While this situation has since been remedied, the route nevertheless remains extremely isolated.

Highway 670 

Secondary Highway 670, commonly referred to as Highway 670, is a  two-lane gravel road running from Highway 638 at Ophir at its western terminus to Dunns Valley at its eastern terminus, which ends at Nardi road. At Highway 670 and Nardi Road, the roadway can continue north to Skookum lake (under a different designation), east along "The Shaw" road to Little Rapids (just north of Thessalon, Ontario) or west, down Nardi road that opens to an 800-acre farm land held within a horseshoe of mountains.

Highway 670 was established in mid- to late 1989, when a  segment of Highway 638 between Ophir and Dunns Valley was renumbered.

References

External links 
 Route of Highway 546 on Google Maps
 Route of Highway 552 on Google Maps
 Route of Highway 554 on Google Maps
 Route of Highway 557 Google Maps
 Route of Highway 639 on Google Maps

 
Roads in Algoma District